Agathotoma finalis is a species of sea snail, a marine gastropod mollusk in the family Mangeliidae. It was first described in 1992.

Distribution 
This species is endemic to São Tomé and Príncipe.

References

External links
 

finalis
Endemic fauna of São Tomé and Príncipe
Invertebrates of São Tomé and Príncipe
Gastropods described in 1992